Limbu (Limbu: , yakthuṅ pan) is a Sino-Tibetan language spoken by the Limbu people of Nepal and Northeastern India (particularly Darjeeling, Kalimpong, Sikkim, Assam and Nagaland) as well as expatriate communities in Bhutan. The Limbu refer to themselves as Yakthung and their language as Yakthungpan. Yakthungpan has four main dialects: Phedape, Chhathare, Tambarkhole and Panthare dialects.

Among four dialects and/or many dialects, the Phedape dialect is widely spoken and well understood by most Yakthungpan speakers. However, as there are some dominant Panthare scholars who have role to create knowledge and control knowledge in the Limbu communities, Panthare dialect is being popularised as a "standard" Limbu language. As Panthare Yakthungs are much more engaged in central political position and administrative positions, they are trying to introduce Panthare dialect as a Standard Yakthungpan.

Yakthungpan (Limbu language) is one of the major languages spoken and written in Nepal, Darjeeling, Kalimpong, Sikkim, and Bhutan. Linguists have reached the conclusion that Yakthungpan resembles Tibetan and Lepcha.

Before the introduction of the Sirijanga script among Limbu Kirats, the Róng script was popular in east Nepal, especially in the early Maurong state. The Sirijanga script had almost disappeared for 800 years and it was brought back into use by  Limbu scholar Te-ongsi Sirijunga Xin Thebe of Tellok Sinam Limbuwan present day Nepal. The Limbu script is called 'Sirijanga' after the Limbu culture- hero Te-ongsi Sirijunga Xin Thebe, who is credited with its invention.

Geographical distribution
Limbu is spoken east of the Arun River in the following districts of Nepal (Ethnologue).

Province No. 1
Dhankuta District
Ilam District
Jhapa District
Morang District
Panchthar District
Sankhuwasabha District
Sunsari District
Taplejung District
Terhathum District

Official status

Nepal
The Language Commission of Nepal has recommended Limbu language as official language in Province No. 1. Chulachuli Rural Municipality, Mangsebung Rural Municipality and Phalgunanda Rural Municipality have recognized Limbu language as an official working language.

India
In India, the state of Sikkim has recognized Limbu language as an additional official language for the purpose of preservation of culture and tradition in the state. The official weekly publication Sikkim Herald has a Limbu Edition.

Dialects
The Limbu languages are divided into four dialects :
Phedappe
Pachthare
Chathare
Taplejunge or Tamarkhole

Ethnologue lists the following dialects of Limbu.

Dialect cluster 1
Panthare
Chaubise (Charkhole)
Yanggrokke (Yanggruppe)
Dialect cluster 2
Phedappe
Tamorkhole (Taplejunge)
Dialect cluster 3
Chhatthare (Chatthare, Chhathar)

Yanggrokke, Chaubise, and Charkhole are minor variants of the Panthare dialect. Phedappe and Tamorkhole are similar. Chattare is less well understood by other dialect speakers. The Limbu dialect spoken in Sikkim, India is the same as Panthare.

Phonology

Vowels and consonants

/, / can be heard as rounded [, ] after labial consonants.

Phonemes in parentheses occur in loan words from Nepali.

Sirijanga script
 
Limbu language is one of the few Sino-Tibetan languages of the central Himalayas with their own scripts. The Limbu script or Sirijanga script was devised during the period of Buddhist expansion in Sikkim in the early 18th century when Limbuwan still constituted part of Sikkimese territory. The Limbu script was probably designed roughly at the same time as the Lepcha script (during the reign of the third King of Sikkim, Phyag-dor Nam-gyal (ca. 1700-1717)). However, it is widely believed that the Limbu script (Sirijanga) had been designed by the Limbu King Sirijanga Hang in the 9th century. The Sirijanga script was later redesigned and re-introduced by Te-ongsi Sirijunga Xin Thebe . As Te-ongsi Sirijunga Xin Thebe spent most of his time in the development of Yakthungpan, Yatkhung culture, and Limbu script; he is considered as the reincarnation of the 9th century King Sirijanga.

As Te-ongsi Sirijunga Xin Thebe was astoundingly influential in spreading the Limbu script, culture, and language, Tasang monks came to fear that he might transform the social, cultural, and linguistic structure of Sikkim. Therefore, Tasang monks captured Sirijunga, bound him to a tree, and shot him to death with poisonous arrows.

Both Limbu and Lepcha were ostensibly devised with the intent of furthering the spread of Buddhism. However, Sirijanga was a Limbu Buddhist who had studied under Sikkimese high Lamas. Sirijanga was given the title 'the Dorje Lama of Yangrup'.

The language and script's influential structure are mixture of Tibetan and Devanagari. Unlike most other Brahmic scripts, it does not have separate independent vowel characters, instead using a vowel carrier letter with the appropriate dependent vowel attached.

The Limbu language and literature have been less practiced in Nepal since the last eighteenth century. The cultural identity of any community was taken as a threat to the national unification by ruling elites until the recent years. The use of the Limbu alphabet was banned and the possession of Limbu writings outlawed. There were no specific laws about it, but the Security Act was enforced for such cases under the strong directives of Kathmandu.

Writing

Limbu has its own unique writing system, which is similar to Tibetan and Sikkimese scripts. The Limbu script or Sirijunga script is unique and scientifically designed by King Sirijanga in the 9th century; it was later re-designed and popularized by Te-ongsi Sirijunga Xin Thebe and his followers in the 18th century. Since teaching of Limbu/Yakthung language and writing was banned by the Khas-Hindus in Nepal after the "Noon Pani Sandhi" between the Limbuwan and Gorkha Kingdom (Prithvi Narayan Shah), far more Limbus are literate in Nepali than in Limbu in Nepal. Although many Limbu books were written in Devanagari and Roman (English), now Limbus/Yakthungs have well developed computerized writing system and many books are published in Limbu script or Sirijunga script.

History of Kirat-Yakthung writing can be divided into the following ways:

 Classical Kirat-Yakthung period: King Sirijanga (9th century AD)
 The 18th century Kirat-Yakthunghang period: Te-ongsi Sirijunga Xin Thebe and his cronies movement
 The 19th century Kirat-Yakthung writers and rhetors: Period of Jobhansing Limbu, Chyangresing Phedangba, Ranadwaj, and Jit Mohan (Brian Hudgson procured books and requested them to write histories, stories, narratives, culture, and so on)
 The 20th Century Kirat-Yakthung writers and rhetors: 
 After the establishment of "Yakthunghang Chumlung" (1925); thereafter, several books were published. 
 Limbu script was much more influenced by Devnagari script at this period. 
 At the same time, both national and international linguists, researchers, and writers addressed the issued in this period. This period is period of inquiry, communication, discovery, and re/construction.
 Late 20th and 21st century Kirat-Yakthung writers and rhetors: This period denotes after the restoration of democracy in Nepal in 1990. Introduction of "Anipan" at school; many research and writing such as MA/MPhil theses and research reports; establishment of Limbu organization at the local and global level; period of delinking, relinking, and linking epistemologies.

Publications
The Limbu language has many papers and publications in circulation.
Tanchoppa (Morning Star), a monthly newspaper/magazine which has been published since 1995. There are many other literary publications.
The oldest known Limbu writings were collected from the Darjeeling district in the 1850s. They are the ancestors of the modern Limbu script. The writings are now a part of a collection in the India Library in London.

Teaching
In Nepal, the Limbu language is taught on private initiative. The Government of Nepal has published "Ani Paan" text books in Limbu for primary education from grades 1 to 12. Kirant Yakthung Chumlung teaches Limbu language and script on its own initiative.

In Sikkim, since the late 1970s, Limbu in the Limbu script has been offered in English-medium schools as a vernacular language subject in areas populated by Limbus. Over 4000 students study Limbu for one hour daily taught by some 300 teachers. Course books are available in Limbu from grades 1 to 12. Additionally, the significance of Limbu in Sikkim is that the name of the Indian state itself is a combination of two Limbu words: su, which means "new", and khyim, which means "palace" or "house".

See also
History of Limbuwan
Limbuwan Gorkha War
Languages of Nepal

References

Further reading
 Driem, George van (1987). A grammar of Limbu. (Mouton grammar library; 4). Berlin: Mouton de Gruyter. 
 Limbu, Marohang (2017). Politics in Rhetoric and Writing in Paracolonial Context: A Glimpse of Limbu Language, Writing, and Literacy in Yakthung Laje. Journal of Global Literacies, Technologies, and Emerging Pedagogies, 4(1), 550-591.
 Limbu, Marohang (2016). Politics of Rhetoric and Writing in the Non-Western World: Delinking, Relinking, and Linking Yakthung Epistemologies. Mikphulla Laje Inghang,10(10) 36-41.

External links

Omniglot modern Limbu writing system
Limbu-English Dictionary of the Mewa Khola dialect (PDF introduction)
Kaipuleohone's LDTC collection includes open access recordings in Limbu

Languages of Nepal
Languages of Bhutan
Kiranti languages
Languages of Sikkim
Official languages of Nepal
Limbu culture
Languages of Koshi Province